Zeeshan Gul (born 12 March 1991) is a Pakistani first-class cricketer who plays for United Bank Limited.

References

External links
 

1991 births
Living people
Pakistani cricketers
United Bank Limited cricketers
People from Badin District